Pino van Lamsweerde (born 9 September 1940, died 10 April 2020) was an Italian–Canadian director and animator.

Personal life 
Born in Turin on September 18, 1940 from Alessandro van Lamsweerde and Giuliana Tracanella. He moves with his family at a very young age to Milan where later in life he attends the Brera Academy, where he specializes in school of nude. In 1966 he embarks to go to Canada, spending a brief period in New York City, where he will remain until 1997 living between Toronto, Ottawa, Vancouver and Montreal. In 1997 he moved to Paris where he remained until his death.

Pino van Lamsweerde grew up and studied in Milan, where he made his first experiences as an animator; in 1966 he moved to Canada, pursuing his studies and working for the National Film Board of Canada. In 1973 he joins the team of 15 directors of the medium-length film Man: The Polluter.  He was then animator in short films and television films, as well as in some episodes of the series Wait Till Your Father Gets Home. In the early 1980s he worked for Atkinson Film-Arts directing the "Harry Canyon" segment of the Heavy Metal movie and some television specials, then moved to Paris where he directed Asterix in Britain (1986), and worked on the storyboards for the television series The Smoggies In the 1990s he worked on the storyboards for the television series Spirou and Problem Child, while between 2004 and 2006 he was director of the exposure sheets (X-Sheets) for the television series Code Lyoko, Monster Allergy and Dragon Hunters. He died in Paris on April 10, 2020, aged 79, of complications from COVID-19.

Professional career 
He starts working in Milan doing artwork and graphics by designing advertising posters. In 1968 he collaborated on the feature film The Magic Bird.

In 1969 after moving to Montreal he began as an animator working on the movie Tiki Tiki. In the 70s he worked on the series Wait Till Your Father Gets Home by Hanna-Barbera between Sydney and Vancouver.

In the mid-1970s he settled in Ottawa where he worked for Atkinson Film Arts as an animation director and then as a director. In 1981 he worked on the film Heavy Metal, in which he directed the Harry Canyon segment.

There he remained until 1985, when he moved to Paris to work as a director on the feature film Asterix in Britain.

In 1987 he moved to Montreal to work as a director, animation director, designer and storyboard artist on several animated television series; The Smoggies, The Nutcracker Prince The Legend of White Fang Spirou.

In 1997 he moved to Paris where he remained until his death, except for a brief interlude in which in 1999 he collaborated in Milan in the realization of a few animated episodes inspired by the character Corto Maltese, co-production Animation Band, Stranemani, Rai.

 Filmography 

 Director 

 1973: Man: The Polluter 1981: Heavy Metal (Harry Canyon) 1983: The Care Bears in the Land Without Feelings 1984: The Care Bears Battle the Freeze Machine 1985: The Velveteen Rabbit 1985: Rumpelstiltskin 1986: Asterix in Britain 1993: Spirou et Fantasio

 Animation 

 1971: Tiki Tiki 1971: In a Nutshell 1973: Man: The Polluter 1973-1974: Wait Till Your Father Gets Home (5 episodes)
 1975: The Energy Carol 1978: The Little Brown Burro 1979: The New Misadventures of Ichabod Crane 1979: Tukiki and His Search for a Merry Christmas 1981: Heavy Metal 1990: The Nutcracker Prince
 1992: The Legend of White Fang 2004: Dragon Hunters 2006: Monster Allergy''

References

External link

1940 births
2020 deaths
Italian film directors
Italian emigrants to Canada
Film people from Turin
Deaths from the COVID-19 pandemic in France